The 1962–63 Loyola Ramblers men's basketball team represented Loyola University Chicago. The head coach was George Ireland.  The Ramblers were the 1963 NCAA tournament champions, defeating top-ranked and two-time defending champion Cincinnati Bearcats in a 60–58 overtime contest. The 1962–63 Ramblers were one of the first NCAA men's Basketball teams to have broken the so-called "gentlemen's agreement" among coaches in which no more than two black players would be on the floor at one time (and in some road games, black players would have to rotate so that only one of them was playing at any given moment): the Ramblers would regularly have three or four black starters, paving the way for the 1965–66 Texas Western Miners men's basketball team who would finally put the "agreement" to rest and have an all-black starting five. They played in the Game of Change, in which a Mississippi State team defied segregationists to play against Loyola, breaking the unwritten law that Mississippi teams would not play against black players.

On July 11, 2013, to commemorate the 50th anniversary of their championship, surviving members of Loyola's team were honored by President Barack Obama in a ceremony at the Oval Office of the White House. It also was announced that the entire team would be inducted in the College Basketball Hall of Fame in a ceremony scheduled for November 2013.

Roster

Schedule

|-
!colspan=8 style=| NCAA Tournament

Rankings

Awards and honors
Jerry Harkness:
Consensus First Team All-American
First Team AP All-American
First Team USBWA All-American
First Team NABC All-American
First Team UPI All-American
Second Team NEA All-American

Team:
 College Basketball Hall of Fame (2013)

Records
Loyola's first-round Mideast Regional victory over Tennessee Tech, 111–42, continues to be the record margin of victory (69 points) in an NCAA men's basketball tournament game.

NBA Draft

References

External links

 Roster and stats at Sports Reference

NCAA Division I men's basketball tournament Final Four seasons
NCAA Division I men's basketball tournament championship seasons
Loyola Ramblers
Loyola Ramblers men's basketball seasons
National Collegiate Basketball Hall of Fame inductees
Loyola Ramblers
Loyola Ramblers
1963 in American sports